This is a list of the episodes of the radio drama series The Red Panda Adventures by Decoder Ring Theater. The episodes are divided by season and listed by the release date. Each entry includes the number of the show, its title, a short description of the episode, and its original release date.

Episode list

Season One

Season Two

Season Three

Season Four

Season Five

Season Six

Season Seven

Season Eight

Season Nine

Season Ten

Season Eleven

References 
 - List of the ''Red Panda Adventures' episodes

Canadian radio dramas
Lists of radio series episodes